Jintang County is a county of Sichuan Province, China, it is under the administration of the prefecture-level city of Chengdu, the provincial capital.

Geography
Jintang is bordered by the prefecture-level cities of Deyang to the north and east and Jianyang to the south.

History
In the 19th century, Jintang County was regarded as producing the best tobacco in Sichuan after nearby Pidu District.

Administrative divisions 
Jintang is subdivided in 6 subdistricts and 10 towns:

Subdistricts

 Zhaodao subdistrict (赵镇街道)
 Guancang subdistrict (官仓街道)
 Qixian subdistrict (栖贤街道)
 Gaoban subdistrict (高板街道)
 Baiguo subdistrict (白果街道)
 Huaikou subdistrict (淮口街道)

Towns

 Wufeng (五凤镇)
 Sanxi (三溪镇)
 Fuxing (福兴镇)
 Jinlong (金龙镇)
 Zhaojia (赵家镇)
 Zhugao (竹篙镇)
 Zhuanlong (转龙镇)
 Tuqiao (土桥镇)
 Yunhe (云合镇)
 Youxin (又新镇)

Climate

Notes

References
Citations

Bibliography
 .

External links
 Government website  (Simplified Chinese)
 Page of description (Simplified Chinese)

Geography of Chengdu
County-level divisions of Sichuan